Kerrang! is a British weekly magazine devoted to rock, punk and heavy metal music, currently published by Wasted Talent (the same company that owns electronic music publication Mixmag). It was first published on 6 June 1981 as a one-off supplement in the Sounds newspaper. Named after the onomatopoeic word that derives from the sound made when playing a power chord on a distorted electric guitar, Kerrang! was initially devoted to the new wave of British heavy metal and the rise of hard rock acts. In the early 2000s, it became the best-selling British music weekly.

History
Kerrang! was founded in 1981. The editor of the weekly music magazine Sounds, Alan Lewis, suggested that Geoff Barton edit a one-off special edition focusing on the new wave of British heavy metal phenomenon and on the rise of other hard rock acts.  It was published on 6 June 1981. Angus Young of AC/DC appeared on Kerrang!s first cover. Launched as a monthly magazine, Kerrang! began to appear on a fortnightly basis later, and in 1987 it went weekly. The original owner was United Newspapers who then sold it to EMAP in 1991.

During the 1980s and early 1990s the magazine placed many thrash and glam metal acts on the cover, including Tigertailz, Mötley Crüe, Slayer, Bon Jovi, Metallica, Poison, and Venom. The term "thrash metal" was first coined in the music press by Kerrang! journalist Malcolm Dome, in reference to the Anthrax song "Metal Thrashing Mad".<ref>Kerrang!' ', issue 62, page 8,23 February 1984</ref> Prior to this Metallica's James Hetfield had referred to their sound as "power metal". The magazine's emphasis would change during the 1990s once grunge acts such as Nirvana rose to fame. Kerrang! has at times faced criticism for repeating this process every time a new musical subgenre becomes popular.Kerrang!s popularity rose again with the hiring of editor Paul Rees circa 2000 when the nu metal genre, featuring bands including Limp Bizkit and Slipknot, was becoming more popular. Rees went on to edit Q magazine and former Kerrang!  reviews editor Ashley Bird was appointed editor from 2003 to 2005. Following his departure, Paul Brannigan took over as editor in May 2005.

With the emergence of emo and metalcore during the mid to late-2000s, the genre focus of Kerrang! shifted once more. The revamp was not welcomed by all readers and many complaints were received about Kerrang!s sudden emphasis on emo and metalcore music. However, following this change, Brannigan took the magazine into its most commercially successful period with a record ever ABC for the title of 80,186 copies. Furthermore, the magazine continued to occasionally feature more established bands such as Iron Maiden and Metallica on the cover, despite being criticised for doing otherwise.

In 2008, EMAP sold its consumer magazines to Bauer Media Group. Brannigan left Kerrang! in 2009 and Nichola Browne was appointed editor. She later stepped down in April 2011. Former NME features editor and GamesMaster deputy editor James McMahon was appointed as editor on 6 June 2011.

In April 2017, Kerrang! magazine, its website, and the K! Awards were purchased by Mixmag Media, publisher of dance monthly Mixmag, along with assets related to defunct style magazine The Face. Mixmag has since formed parent company Wasted Talent, which relaunched Kerrang! as a digital-first title, while continuing to publish a weekly print edition. Former Editor-in-Chief Phil Alexander was appointed Global Creative Director on 3 August 2017. Bauer retained ownership of Kerrang! Radio and the Box Plus Network will continue to operate Kerrang! TV as before. An updated Kerrang! logo was debuted in mid-2017 before the magazine received a complete redesign during 2018. This change saw several of the magazine's long-running features dropped, including the Ultimate Rockstar Test, while new features were added in their place.

In March 2020, publication of the print edition of Kerrang! was suspended due to the Covid-19 pandemic. The website continued to run articles as normal, with a weekly 'cover story' long-form article being introduced later in the year. In late 2021, a one-off print edition of Kerrang! was published, celebrating the return of live music events in the UK. Sales of this magazine proved successful enough that a second stand-alone print magazine was published in April 2022.

International editions
Emap launched Kerrang! Australia in the late 1990s. Unlike its weekly counterpart in the UK, the Australian edition was published monthly due to stiff competition from free local music publications. Kerrang! is also published in Spanish and German. Kerrang announced its aim to expand into the US in March 2018.

In March 2018, following a magazine redesign, Kerrang! announced it would be expanding to the United States, with an office in New York run by Ethan Fixell. The goal would be to generate US-centric content, events, and brand partnerships.

WebsiteKerrang!'s website, www.kerrang.com, was launched in summer 2001 by Dan Silver. Kerrang!'s parent company Emap acquired the domain name from a Norwegian cybersquatter by the name of Steingram Stegane for a token sum of £666.Kerrang!'s website features news and features on both contemporary and classic rock bands, as well as previewing upcoming events. The website hosts Kerrang!'s online shop, podcasts, message board, TV and radio segments ensuring more opportunities to sell associated merchandise and products. In 2001, Kerrang! launched its own online forum with the "rants and raves" section taking up most of the traffic. According to Alexa www.kerrang.com is ranked 83,545th globally, and 33,532nd in the U.S.

Kerrang! Awards

Since 1993, the magazine has held an annual awards ceremony to mark the most successful bands in the interests of their readers. The awards became one of Britain's most recognised events by the now defunct Guinness Book of British Hit Singles & Albums, often listing some of the winners in their annual round-up of the previous year. The event is presented by major music celebrities, with many others outside the industry who attend the event.

After a year hiatus, the Awards were relaunched in 2018, with notable guests that included Johnny Depp, Joe Perry, Tony Iommi, Corey Taylor, and Dave Grohl, among others. After a two-year hiatus due to the Covid-19 pandemic, the ceremony returned in June 2022, with the reader nominations period beginning in April 2022.

Kerrang! Radio

In 2000, EMAP launched Kerrang!'' as a digital radio station, across the United Kingdom. This was principally a 'jukebox' station, playing a back-to-back sequence of rock and alternative music. On 10 June 2004, Kerrang! 105.2 was launched as a regional radio station in Birmingham with an advertising campaign by London-based creative agency ODD. The radio had a number of specialist programmes dedicated to the many subgenres of rock music. The radio output included interviews with those affecting popular culture and society as well as those involved with music. It stopped broadcasting on FM as of 14 June 2013 and once again became a digital station, with listeners able to tune in on DAB or the Kerrang! Radio app. With this broadcasting change came a move in Kerrang! Radio's offices from Birmingham to London. Absolute Radio is now broadcasting on its FM frequency.

Kerrang! TV

In 2001 EMAP launched Kerrang! TV. As with the radio station, the television channel covers the more mainstream side of the rock music as well as classic rock bands including Aerosmith, AC/DC and Guns N' Roses and classic heavy metal bands such as Iron Maiden, Black Sabbath and Metallica. Kerrang! TV, along with its The Box Plus Network sister channels, is now fully owned by Channel Four Television Corporation.

Kerrang! Tour
The Kerrang! Tour ran from 2006 to 2017. The line-up for each year was usually announced in October of the previous year and was held throughout January and February of the following year. Relentless Energy Drink sponsored the Kerrang! Tour for several years. It is currently unknown if the tour will ever be revived.

2006, featured Bullet for My Valentine, Hawthorne Heights, Still Remains and Aiden.
2007, featured Biffy Clyro, The Bronx, The Audition and I Am Ghost.
2008, featured Coheed and Cambria, Madina Lake, Fightstar and Circa Survive.
2009, sponsored by Relentless Energy Drink from this year; featured Mindless Self Indulgence, Dir En Grey, Bring Me the Horizon, Black Tide and In Case of Fire.
2010, featured All Time Low, The Blackout, Young Guns and My Passion. Jettblack were added for two dates at the London Roundhouse at the end of the tour.
2011, featured Good Charlotte, Four Year Strong, Framing Hanley and The Wonder Years.
2012. The tour lasted from 5 to 17 February. It featured New Found Glory, Sum 41, letlive. and While She Sleeps. On 20 January 2012 it was revealed that Sum 41 had been unfortunately forced to pull out due to frontman Deryck Whibley who had suffered a back injury and was not well enough to perform for the duration of the tour, they were replaced by The Blackout who had previously played on the 2010 tour.
2013, featured Black Veil Brides, Chiodos, Tonight Alive and Fearless Vampire Killers. It was an 11-date tour which ran from 3–15 February, with the 6th and 11th being days off. William Control was a guest DJ and also appeared alongside Black Veil Brides on 2 songs; Shadows Die and In the End.
2014, featured Limp Bizkit, Crossfaith, Nekrogoblikon and Baby Godzilla.
2015, featured Don Broco, We Are the in Crowd, Bury Tomorrow, Beartooth and Young Guns.
2016. On 29 September the headliner for the eleventh Kerrang! tour was revealed to be Sum 41. In an interview with Kerrang, frontman Deryck Whibley stated that "After a three-year break, we're honoured that our first tour back is the Kerrang!" The tour featured Sum 41, Roam, Frank Carter & The Rattlesnakes and Biters.
2017, featured The Amity Affliction, Boston Manor, Vukovi, and Casey.

The K! Pit
The year after the final Kerrang! Tour, Kerrang! launched a new gig concept known as 'The K! Pit', where the magazine promotes a free gig for a popular band in a tiny London venue. Fans gain access by applying for tickets online and being selected at random in a competition-style draw. Artists featured so far include Parkway Drive, Mastodon, Fever 333, and Neck Deep, the latter performance coinciding with the 2018 Kerrang! Awards where Neck Deep would win 'Best Song'. The brand has since also launched the series in Brooklyn, New York, featuring artists such as Sum 41, Baroness, Knocked Loose, Daughters, Fit For An Autopsy. Performances are also streamed on the Kerrang! Facebook page before being uploaded to YouTube.

The Official Kerrang! Rock Chart
During the 1980s, Kerrang! published weekly heavy metal charts for singles, albums and import albums. Each was compiled from sales data from fifty specialist stores across the United Kingdom.

In March 2012, Kerrang! announced a new weekly rock singles chart for the UK based on upon airplay across Kerrang Radio, Kerrang TV, and specialist rock radio stations, as well as sales figures from the Official Charts Company. As of 2020, the chart continues to be printed in the magazine every week, contains 20 tracks, and often features accompanying facts or artist quotes. The official Kerrang Spotify profile also features a playlist of the tracks on the chart and is updated every Wednesday. The chart was announced on Saturday mornings on Kerrang! Radio and could be viewed online every Saturday at midday. The chart would also be shown on Kerrang! TV on Thursdays at 4 pm.

Unlike the UK Rock & Metal Singles Chart produced by the Official Charts Company, which is typically dominated by classic rock artists, the Kerrang! Rock Chart focuses primarily on new releases by contemporary rock artists.

References

External links
 

 
1981 establishments in the United Kingdom
British heavy metal music
Music magazines published in the United Kingdom
Weekly magazines published in the United Kingdom
Heavy metal publications
Magazines established in 1981
Newspaper supplements
Magazines published in London
British record charts